Cesare Augusto Fasanelli (19 May 1907 – 4 April 1992) was an Italian professional footballer who played as a midfielder.

Career
Fasanelli played for 7 seasons (157 games, 48 goals) in the Serie A for A.S. Roma, ACF Fiorentina and Genova 1893.

Honours

Club
Genoa
 Coppa Italia winner: 1936–37.

Individual
 Among the Top 10 goalscorers of Serie A in the 1930–31 season (17 goals).

1907 births
1992 deaths
Italian footballers
Serie A players
Serie B players
Serie C players
A.S. Roma players
Pisa S.C. players
ACF Fiorentina players
Genoa C.F.C. players
Parma Calcio 1913 players
Association football midfielders